The following is a list of Thailand's largest shopping malls, ranked by gross leasable area (GLA).

See also 
 List of shopping malls in Bangkok
 List of shopping malls in Thailand
 List of the world's largest shopping malls

References

Thailand, largest

Shopping malls, Thailand
Shopping malls, largest
[[Category:Lists of Best Shopping Offers sites in Thailand|Shopping malls, largest]]